Sounds Like Searchers is the fourth studio album by the English rock band The Searchers and the group's first LP featuring singer and bass player Frank Allen. Album features title track of the band's UK No.1 EP "Bumble Bee" as well as cover versions of some well known tracks written or co-written by Burt Bacharach, John Barry or Jackie DeShannon. The album has reached the Top 10 in the UK album chart.

Overview
The departure of singer Tony Jackson from the band did not threaten its popularity. The Searchers had another string of hits with new bassist and singer Frank Allen (chart-buster "When You Walk in the Room", folk protest song "What Have They Done to the Rain" and another smash "Goodbye My Love"), before they released another album.
Although all band members tried to write their own compositions, just three of Chris Curtis songs made it to the album. “Frank (Allen) and I were writing, but there was never any real respect paid to our songs,” said John McNally about this period. Success gave them a little more control in the studio work (two years ago they recorded their first album in one day). Yet they were not satisfied. "We never had a real concept for our albums," said Frank Allen. "Plus we tended to record our songs very quickly… We certainly weren’t allowed the time to perfect our arrangements, or make them more elaborate, the way that groups like The Beatles did."

Release
Sounds Like Searchers was released as a monaural (mono) LP album on the Pye label in the UK on March 19, 1965, Pye NPL 18111. It entered the LP charts on March 27, 1965 went to No. 8 and stayed for 17 weeks. An EP called "Four by Four" with songs taken from the album (with "Till You Say You'll Be Mine" as the lead track) was released on the Pye Records NEP 24228 on November 1965 but failed to chart.

In the Netherlands, "I Don't Want to Go On Without You" was issued as a single A-side and reached No. 17 (in the meantime "Bumble Bee" reached No. 23 on the Dutch Top 40). The Moody Blues also recorded and released hit version of the song at the same time. Another beat group from The Searchers hometown Liverpool, The Kubas, did a rendition of "Magic Potion" in 1965 but failed to chart.

Track listing

US version (The New Searchers LP)

Album was released in the US on Kapp Records as "The New Searchers LP (Chris, John, Mike, Frank)" with a different cover but using similar track order (included actual hit single "What Have They Done to the Rain" instead of the song "Let The Good Times Roll"). The album entered Billboard Top 200 on March 20, 1965 went to No. 112 and stayed for 7 weeks. Album track "Bumble Bee" was released as the main single of the album in the US and went to No. 21 on the Billboard Hot 100.

Track listing

Personnel
The Searchers
 Mike Pender – lead guitar, lead vocals, backing vocals
 John McNally – rhythm guitar, lead and backing vocals
 Frank Allen – bass, lead and backing vocals
 Chris Curtis – drums, lead and backing vocals
Additional musicians and production
 Tony Hatch – producer, piano
 Ray Prickett – recording engineer

References

1965 albums
The Searchers (band) albums
Albums produced by Tony Hatch
Pye Records albums